Yusif Mirzayev (23 May 1958 – 19 February 1993) was an Azerbaijani soldier and participant of the First Nagorno-Karabakh War. He was posthumously awarded the title of the National Hero of Azerbaijan.

Life
Mirzayev was born on 23 May 1958 in the Böyükdüz village of the Kangarli District of the Nakhchivan Autonomous Republic of Azerbaijan. He graduated from secondary school #1 named after I. Safarali in Nakhchivan in 1975. He started his career at Nakhchivan Communication Center in 1976. He was working and studying at Azerbaijani State Agricultural Institute (present Baku State University of Economics) in the faculty of Accounting at the same time. He was appointed as an auditor in one of the banks in Baku and graduated from the university in 1987.

Mirzayev joined the National Movement in 1988. During the Black January events of 1990, Russian soldiers captured and tortured him.

In battles
He joined the army in 1991 during the First Nagorno-Karabakh War. Mirzayev's first battle took place at the crossroads between Aghdara and Goranboy. He became an active fighter in a very short time and gained military knowledge as well. Thus, he was appointed as a Deputy Procurement by his commanders. He died in a battle while helping soldiers to break the siege in Aghdara region on 19 February 1993.

Family
Mirzayev was married and had a daughter.

Recognition
He was posthumously awarded the title of the National Hero of Azerbaijan by the decree # 495 of the President of Azerbaijan on 27 March 1993.

He was buried at the Nakhchivan city Alley of Martyrs.

One of the schools in Nakhchivan city as well as the school # 44 in Nasimi District of Baku is named after him. There is also a monument of him in the school yard.

His close friend, Azerbaijani singer Shamistan Alizamanli, dedicated his song "Brave Soldier" to him.

References

External links
 Fəxrəddin Quliyev, "Milli qəhrəmanlar", Məktəb (qəzet)|"Məktəb" qəzeti, No.39(304), 20 oktyabr 2014-cü il. səh.1
Vüqar Əsgərov. Azərbaycanın Milli Qəhrəmanları (kitab)|"Azərbaycanın Milli Qəhrəmanları" (Yenidən işlənmiş II nəşr). Bakı: "Dərələyəz-M", 2010, səh. 213.

1958 births
1993 deaths
People from Nakhchivan
Azerbaijani military personnel
Azerbaijani military personnel of the Nagorno-Karabakh War
Azerbaijani military personnel killed in action
National Heroes of Azerbaijan
People from Kangarli District